Paulo Barros may refer to:

Paulo Barros (born 1963), Portuguese musician, member of Tarantula (band)
Paulo Barros (carnival planner) (born 1962), Brazilian carnavalesco
Paulo Barros (basketball) (born 1989), Angolan basketball player